Ira Davenport (June 28, 1841 – October 6, 1904) was an American businessman, politician and philanthropist.  He was most notable for his service in the New York State Senate (1878-1881), as New York State Comptroller (1882-1883), and a member of Congress from New York's 29th congressional district (1885-1889).

Early life
Davenport was born in Hornellsville, New York, the son of Ira Davenport (1795-1868) and Lydia Cameron (1800-1842).  His family moved to Bath in 1847, and Davenport attended Bath's Haverling Academy and the Russell Collegiate School in New Haven, Connecticut.

Davenport's father owned and operated a large estate and was active in numerous business ventures including stores, farms, lumber, freight transportation, and real estate speculation.  After his father's death, Davenport took over management of these enterprises.

Political career
He was a member of the New York State Senate (27th D.) from 1878 to 1881, sitting in the 101st, 102nd, 103rd and 104th New York State Legislatures.  He was New York State Comptroller from 1882 to 1883, elected in 1881, but defeated for re-election in 1883 by Democrat Alfred C. Chapin.

Davenport was a member of the 49th and 50th United States Congresses, holding office from March 4, 1885 to March 3, 1889.  He was the Republican candidate for Governor of New York in the 1885 election, and was defeated by Democrat David B. Hill.

Death and burial
Davenport died in Bath on October 6, 1904.  He was buried at the Davenport Family Cemetery in Bath.

Family
On April 27, 1887 in Kingston, New York, Davenport married Katherine Lawrence Sharpe (1860-1945), the daughter of George H. Sharpe.  She was the granddaughter of Abraham Bruyn Hasbrouck, great-granddaughter of Abraham J. Hasbrouck and a descendant of Louis DuBois. They had no children.

Legacy
The Davenport family's charitable donations included founding a home for orphaned girls, which was financed by the senior Ira Davenport and his brother Charles, and supported by Ira Davenport Jr.  Once closed after 94 years of operation, the orphanage's assets endowed Bath's Ira Davenport Memorial Hospital, which was named after the senior Ira Davenport.  The younger Ira Davenport was a founder of the Bath Soldiers' and Sailors' Home and the town's public library.  From 1906 to 1999 (when a new facility opened), the library was named for Ira Junior.  The Davenports also made substantial contributions to fund Bath's monumental First Presbyterian Church, with its Tiffany sanctuary.  A small Davenport Park in Bath is named for the family, and a squash court at Amherst College is named for Ira Junior's brother John.

References

Sources

Books

Newspapers

External links

Ira Davenport at The Political Graveyard

1841 births
1904 deaths
New York State Comptrollers
Republican Party New York (state) state senators
People from Hornellsville, New York
Republican Party members of the United States House of Representatives from New York (state)
People from Bath, New York
19th-century American politicians